Jiří Liška may refer to:

 Jiří Liška (handballer) (born 1952), Czech handball player
 Jiří Liška (politician) (born 1949), Czech politician and veterinarian
 Jiří Liška (footballer) (born 1982), Czech football defender